Kolukkumalai is a small village/hamlet in Bodinayakanur Taluk in the Theni district of the Indian state of Tamil Nadu. It is home to the highest tea plantations in the world with the tea grown here possessing a special flavour and freshness because of the high altitude. It is situated near Munnar.

Geography
The hill top village is accessible only by jeep due to rugged and rain drenched roads covering up to 17 km. It is about a one and a half hour journey from Munnar town. The exact location of kolukkumalai is in Theni district (Tamil Nadu) . The approach road is via Suryanelli near Munnar in Idukki district of Kerala.

Tourism

Visitor attractions include:
 Devikulam
 Chinnar Wildlife Sanctuary
 Munnar
 Idukki
 Thekkadi
 Theni
 Meesapulimala
 Kambam

Colleges
 Cardamom Planters' Associations College, Bodinayakanur
 Government Engineering College, Bodinayakanur

Schools
 P.U. Primary School Kurangani

Administration and Politics
This place belongs to Kottagudi Panchayath of Bodinayakanur taluk. It had 139 voters as on 2014. This village belongs to Bodinayakanur assembly seat. A TNSTC bus starts at 4 am in Theni towards Suryanelli which is the only bus from the state it belongs to. KSRTC buses run regularly to Suryanelli

See also
 Chinnakanal
 Munnar

References

External links
 

Villages in Theni district
Hill stations in Tamil Nadu